Cresswell may refer to:

Places

England
Cresswell, Northumberland, England
Cresswell Castle, Northumberland or Cresswell Pele Tower, constructed in the 15th century
Cresswell, Staffordshire, near Stoke-on-Trent
Cresswell Quay, a settlement in the community of Jeffreyston, Pembrokeshire, England
Cresswell Castle, 13th-century stone fortified manorial complex

Other places
Mount Cresswell, Prince Charles Mountains, Antarctica
Cresswell Downs, a cattle station in the Northern Territory, Australia
Cresswell, a community in Kawartha Lakes, Ontario, Canada

Other uses
Cresswell (surname)

See also
Creswell (disambiguation)